William Maurice Beatley (11 November 1923 – 22 July 2005) was a British fencer.

Fencing career
He competed in the individual and team sabre events at the 1952 Summer Olympics.

He represented England and won a silver medal in the team sabre at the 1954 British Empire and Commonwealth Games in Vancouver, Canada.

References

1923 births
2005 deaths
British male fencers
Olympic fencers of Great Britain
Fencers at the 1952 Summer Olympics
Commonwealth Games medallists in fencing
Commonwealth Games silver medallists for England
Fencers at the 1954 British Empire and Commonwealth Games
Medallists at the 1954 British Empire and Commonwealth Games